Danny Miranda Agramonte (born November 12, 1978 in Morón, Cuba) is a first baseman for Ciego de Ávila of the Cuban National Series. Miranda has represented Cuba at many international competitions including the 2004 Summer Olympics in Athens, where the Cuban team won the gold medal.

During the 2005-06 Cuban National Series, Miranda led Ciego de Ávila with 18 home runs and 73 runs batted in, and tied for the team lead in doubles (17) while maintaining a .310 batting average.

References

1978 births
Living people
Olympic baseball players of Cuba
Baseball players at the 2004 Summer Olympics
Olympic gold medalists for Cuba
Medalists at the 2004 Summer Olympics
People from Morón, Cuba